Susanna Hartigan is an American author and journalist. Her first book, Unheard: a memoir, was published in 2010. She was a finalist in the Three-Minute Fiction contest on NPR's All Things Considered. She contributes to various websites and magazines on the subjects of fibromyalgia, allergies, food allergies, writing and dream interpretation.

References

American fiction writers
Living people
American women writers
Year of birth missing (living people)
21st-century American women